André Silva Batista (born 20 February 1980) is a retired Brazilian football midfielder.

References

1980 births
Living people
Brazilian footballers
NK Osijek players
NK Čakovec players
NK Međimurje players
NK Croatia Sesvete players
NK Lučko players
Association football defenders
Footballers from Rio de Janeiro (city)